Allette is a given name. Notable people with the name include:

Allette Brooks, American folk singer/songwriter
Verna Allette Wilkins, author, founder of Tamarind Books

See also
Alette, commune in the Pas-de-Calais department in northern France